Symbatica cryphias is a moth in the family Gelechiidae. It was described by Edward Meyrick in 1910. It is found in South Africa.

The wingspan is about 25 mm. The forewings are grey sprinkled with black and white. The discal stigmata are represented by small spots of blackish sprinkles connected by a streak of white suffusion. The hindwings are grey.

References

Endemic moths of South Africa
Gelechiinae
Moths described in 1910
Taxa named by Edward Meyrick